Abigail Lynn Dahlkemper (born May 13, 1993) is an American professional soccer player who plays as a defender for San Diego Wave FC of the National Women's Soccer League (NWSL) and the United States national team.

Early life
Dahlkemper was born in Lancaster, Pennsylvania and raised in Menlo Park, California. She has two brothers, Andrew (the oldest) and Joseph (the youngest) and is the daughter of Andrew and Susan Dahlkemper. She attended Sacred Heart Preparatory and played on the soccer team. In 2010, she was named Gatorade California Girls Soccer Player of the Year and a Parade All-American.

College career
In 2013, she helped the UCLA Bruins win their first ever NCAA National Championship. In 2014, Dahlkemper was awarded the Honda Sports Award.

Club career
In 2013, Dahlkemper signed with the Pali Blues in the W-League. The team won the western conference title as well as the national championship in July 2013.

Western New York Flash
In January 2015, Dahlkemper was selected by the Western New York Flash in the 2015 NWSL College Draft as the third overall pick. She was signed to the team in March and made her debut in April. Dahlkemper won the NWSL Championship with the Flash in 2016.

Adelaide United (loan)
In October 2015, Dahlkemper joined Adelaide United in the Australian W-League on loan for the 2015–16 season.

North Carolina Courage
Dahlkemper became part of the North Carolina Courage in 2017 after the Western New York Flash was sold to the owners of North Carolina FC. She played every minute for the Courage in 2017 helping them win the NWSL Shield. Dahlkemper was named to the 2017 NWSL Best XI. Dahlkemper was voted NWSL Defender of the Year for the 2017 Season.

In 2018 Dahlkemper played 19 regular season games for North Carolina. She was an important part of North Carolina's defense which broke the record for fewest goals conceded and repeated as NWSL Shield winners. She was named to the 2018 NWSL Best XI and was a finalist for Defender of the year. North Carolina won the 2018 NWSL Championship with a 3–0 win over Portland, and didn't concede any goals in the playoffs.

Manchester City
On January 16, 2021, Dahlkemper joined Manchester City of the English FA WSL on a two and a half year deal, becoming the third American international to sign for the club during the 2020–21 season following Sam Mewis and Rose Lavelle's arrivals in summer.

On August 20, 2021, Manchester City announced that Dahlkemper had left the club.

Houston Dash
On August 29, 2021, Houston Dash announced that they had acquired Dahlkemper from the North Carolina Courage.

San Diego Wave
On November 22, 2021, Dahlkemper was announced as the first-ever player signing by NWSL expansion club San Diego Wave FC.

International career

In 2013, Dahlkemper represented the United States under-23 women's national soccer team at the 2013 Four Nations Tournament helping the under-23 team win the championship. She played in the 2014 Six Nations Tournament as a member of the under-23 team and helped lead the team to win the championship for a second time.

Dahlkemper received her first call-up to the U.S. Women's National Team in October 2016 for a set of friendlies against Switzerland. On October 19 she earned her first cap, as she came in as a second-half substitute. Due to a sepsis infection contracted at the end of 2016, Dahlkemper was unable to appear for the U.S. WNT until June 2017.

Following her recovery from sepsis, Dahlkemper quickly became a mainstay for the United States in central defense. She played her first 90 for the U.S. WNT against Norway on June 11, 2017. Dahlkemper would start 10 of the final 11 games of the year, accumulating 945 minutes in 2017, which was fifth highest on the team.

In 2018 Dahlkemper won the SheBelieves Cup and the Tournament of Nations with the U.S. WNT. On September 19, she was named to the final 20 player roster for the 2018 CONCACAF Women's Championship.

In 2019, Dahlkemper was the starting central defender for the national team beside Becky Sauerbrunn at the 2019 FIFA Women's World Cup in France, marking her first World Cup appearance. Dahlkemper and goalkeeper Alyssa Naeher were the only players to start every match of the tournament for the United States, with Dahlkemper playing every minute of the team's seven games aside from coming off in the 82nd minute against Chile in the group stage. Dahlkemper and the United States defeated the Netherlands 2–0 in the final to win the United States' fourth Women's World Cup title.

Personal life
In 2019, along with USWNT teammates Crystal Dunn, Megan Rapinoe, and Alex Morgan, Dahlkemper posed for the 2019 Sports Illustrated Swimsuit Issue in Saint Lucia. She is married to Aaron Schoenfeld. They started dating in May 2019 and announced their engagement in December 2020. Shortly after, they got married in a private ceremony on January 5, 2021.

Career statistics

Club summary
.

World Cup appearances

Olympic appearances

Honors
UCLA
 NCAA Women's Soccer Championship: 2013
Honda Sports Award 2014
United States
FIFA Women's World Cup: 2019
 Olympic Bronze Medal: 2020
 CONCACAF Women's Championship: 2018
 CONCACAF Women's Olympic Qualifying Tournament: 2020
 SheBelieves Cup: 2018, 2020, 2021
 Tournament of Nations: 2018
Western New York Flash
NWSL Champions: 2016
North Carolina Courage
NWSL Champions: 2018, 2019
NWSL Shield: 2017, 2018,  2019
Individual
 NWSL Defender of the Year: 2017
NWSL Best XI: 2017, 2018, 2019

See also
 List of United States women's international soccer players
 List of UCLA Bruins people
 List of Adelaide United FC club award winners

References

External links

 US Soccer player profile
 Western New York Flash player profile
 UCLA player profile
 
 
 
 

1993 births
Living people
UCLA Bruins women's soccer players
American women's soccer players
Association footballers' wives and girlfriends
Parade High School All-Americans (girls' soccer)
Soccer players from California
Sportspeople from the San Francisco Bay Area
Pali Blues players
National Women's Soccer League players
Western New York Flash players
Adelaide United FC (A-League Women) players
Sportspeople from Lancaster, Pennsylvania
People from Menlo Park, California
Women's association football defenders
United States women's international soccer players
Western New York Flash draft picks
United States women's under-20 international soccer players
North Carolina Courage players
San Diego Wave FC players
Schools of the Sacred Heart alumni
2019 FIFA Women's World Cup players
FIFA Women's World Cup-winning players
Footballers at the 2020 Summer Olympics
Olympic bronze medalists for the United States in soccer
Medalists at the 2020 Summer Olympics
21st-century American women
American expatriate sportspeople in England
American expatriate women's soccer players
American expatriate sportspeople in Australia
Expatriate women's footballers in England
Expatriate women's soccer players in Australia